Robert Blair (1593 – 27 August 1666) was a Scottish presbyterian minister who became a Westminster Divine and Moderator of the General Assembly of the Church of Scotland in 1646, after failing to emigrate to Boston in 1636. Born in Irvine in 1593, the sixth son of John Blair of Windyedge, a merchant-adventurer and cadet of Blair, and Beatrix Mure of the Rowallan family, he gained an MA at the University of Glasgow in 1612 and became regent there in 1615. When the episcopalian John Cameron was appointed Principal, Blair resigned and went to Ireland, to become minister of a Presbyterian congregation at Bangor, County Down. He was ordained for it by Robert Echlin, Bishop of Down and Connor, Blair was "very careful to inform... of what accusations had been laid against me of disaffection to the civil powers, whom he was the use of the English liturgy nor Episcopal government.... I declared my opinion fully to the Bishop at our first meeting... [who] said to me, 'I hear good of you, and will impose no conditions on you'". Echlin, however, turned against him. In September 1631, he was suspended from his ministry and on 4 May 1632 deposed. Though bent on emigrating to New England, the ship in which he and other ministers sailed was driven back by weather, a sign, Blair thought, that his services were still required at home. He dodged an order for his arrest by escaping to Scotland and was admitted to the Second Charge of Ayr in July 1638. After periods in Scotland and Ireland, he accompanied the Scottish army to England in 1640 and helped to negotiate the 1641 Peace of Ripon. In 1646, Blair was elected Moderator of General Assembly, then Chaplain-in-Ordinary to King Charles I. He was also on a committee endeavouring in 1648 to get Cromwell to establish "a uniformity of religion in England". He was summoned to London by Cromwell in 1654, but excused himself on grounds of ill health. On the establishment of episcopacy he was removed from his charges in September 1661, confined to Musselburgh, then to Kirkcaldy for three and a half years, and then to Meikle Couston, Aberdour, Fife, where he died on 27 August 1666 and was buried.

Life

He was a native of Irvine, Ayrshire. His father was a merchant-adventurer, John Blair of Windyedge, a younger brother of the family of Blair of that ilk; his mother was Beatrix Muir (of the house of Rowallan), who lived for nearly a century.

From the parish school at Irvine Blair proceeded to the University of Glasgow, where he took his degree of M.A. He is stated to have acted as a schoolmaster in Glasgow. In his twenty-second year he was appointed a regent or professor in the university. One of his students was the future author of polemics for the Covenanters, Robert Baillie. In 1616 he was licensed as a preacher of the gospel in connection with the established church (presbyterian) of Scotland. In 1622 he resigned his professorship.

Having gone over to Ireland, he was called to Bangor, County Down, and ordained by Robert Echlin, the Bishop of Down, on 10 July 1623. But he was suspended in the autumn of 1631, and deposed in 1632 for nonconformity; Echlin had turned a blind eye in the 1620s to presbyterian clergy in his diocese, but Blair (on his own account) didn't react to hints by Theophilus Buckworth, Bishop of Dromore, and was then interviewed by James Ussher, who tried to persuade him with arguments current from John Sprint. By the intervention of the king, Charles I, he was restored in May 1634; but the former sentence was renewed, with excommunication, by John Bramhall, bishop of Derry, the same year.

Excommunicated and ejected, Blair, along with others, fitted out a ship, intending to go to New England in 1635. But the weather proved so bad that they were beaten back, and, returning to Scotland, he lived partly in that country and partly in England. Orders were issued in England for his apprehension in 1637, but he escaped to Scotland, and preached for some time in Ayr. He was invited to go to France as chaplain to the regiment of Colonel Patrick Hepburn of Waughton, but after embarking at Leith he was threatened by a soldier whom he had reproved for swearing, and went ashore again. He also petitioned the privy council 'for liberty to preach the gospel,' and received an appointment at Burntisland in April 1638. He was nominated to St. Andrews in the same year, and was admitted there on 8 October 1639.

In the Second Bishops' War of 1640, he accompanied the Scottish army on its march into England. He assisted in the negotiations for the treaty of peace presented by Charles I on 8 November 1641. After the Irish Rebellion of 1641 he once more went to Ireland with several other clergymen of the Scottish kirk, the Irish general assembly (presbyterian) having petitioned for supplies for their vacant charges. He afterwards returned to St. Andrews.

In 1645 he attended the lord president Robert Spottiswoode and others to the scaffold. In the same year, he was one of the Scottish ministers who went to Newcastle to speak very plainly to the king. In 1646 he was elected Moderator of the General Assembly of the Church of Scotland (3 June). Later, on the death of Alexander Henderson, he was appointed chaplain-in-ordinary to the king, supported by the revenues of the Chapel Royal. The Commission of the General Assembly, in 1648, named him one of those for 'endeavouring to get Cromwell to establish a uniformity of religion in England.'

At the division of the church, in 1650, into Resolutioners and Protesters, he leaned to the former, but lamented the strife. Summoned with others to London in 1654, that 'a method might be devised for settling affairs of the church', he pleaded ill-health and declined to go. In the same year he was appointed by the council of England 'one of those for the admission to the ministry in Perth, Fife, and Angus.'

At the Restoration, he came under the notice of Archbishop James Sharp, had to resign his charge in September 1661, and was confined to certain places, first of all to Musselburgh, afterwards to Kirkcaldy (where he remained three and a half years), and finally to Meikle Couston near Aberdour. As a Covenanter he preached outdoors. He died at Aberdour on 27 August 1666, and was buried in the parish churchyard.

Works
Autobiography was published by the Wodrow Society (1848); fragments were published in 1754.
Preface to Durham's Treatise on Scandal. 
Commentary on the Book of Proverbs, (ready but not published)
Answer to Bishop Hall's Remonstrance, ready for the Press, but these were never published.

Bibliography
Edin. Guild. Reg. ; 
Edin. Marr. Reg. ; 
Reg. Sec. Sig. ; 
G. R. Sas., iii. 164, ix. 106; 
Lamont's Diary; 
Tombst. ; 
Baillie's Letters ; 
Hill's Life of Hugh Blair ; 
Reid's Ireland, i., 101 et seq. ; 
Dictionary Nat. Biog. 
Reed's Presbyterianism of Ireland, i.; 
Row and Stevenson's Hist.; 
Rutherford's and Baillie's Letters; 
Kirkcaldy Presb. Reg.; 
Connolly's Fifeshire; 
Chambers's Biogr.; 
Scott's Fasti, ii. 91; 
Hill's Life of Hugh Blair

Family
He married first Beatrix, daughter of Robert Hamilton, merchant, in right of whom he became a burgess of Edinburgh on 16 July 1626; she died in July 1632, aged 27. Their issue were two sons and a daughter: James, one of the ministers of Dysart, Robert, and Jean, who married William Row, minister of Ceres. His second wife was Katherine, daughter of Hugh Montgomerie of Braidstane, afterwards Viscount Airds. Their issue were seven sons and a daughter. One of these sons, David, was the father of Robert Blair, the poet of the Grave, and another, Hugh, grandfather of Dr. Hugh Blair.

He married (1) on 16 July 1626, Beatrix (died July 1632, aged 27), daugh. of Robert Hamilton, merchant, burgess of Edinburgh, and had issue – James, min. of Dysart; Robert; Jean (marr. William Row, min. of Ceres). He married (2) Katherine, daugh. of Hugh Montgomerie of Braidstane, Viscount Airds, and had issue – William; David, min. of Old Kirk Parish, Edinburgh [father of Robert B., min. of Athelstane-ford, author of The Grave]; Samuel; John, writer, Edinburgh, born 1640; Archibald; Alexander in Edinburgh; Andrew, born 1644; Montgomery, born 1646; Hugh, merchant, Edinburgh; Catherine (marr. George Campbell, min. of Old Kirk, Edinburgh, and Professor of Divinity).

References
Citations

Sources

1593 births
1666 deaths
Moderators of the General Assembly of the Church of Scotland
Scottish Commissioners at the Westminster Assembly
People from Irvine, North Ayrshire
Alumni of the University of Glasgow
Irish Presbyterian ministers